Devon is a census-designated place (CDP) located in Tredyffrin Township and Easttown Township. The population was 1,515 at the 2010 census. The area is part of the Philadelphia Main Line suburbs.

Geography

Culture
Devon is known for the Devon Horse Show, the oldest and largest outdoor multi-breed horse competition in the United States. The event is held over ten days in late May and early June.

It was also home to the Valley Forge Music Fair from 1955 to 1996, hosting hundreds of famous musical and comedy acts.

Education
The public school system is Tredyffrin-Easttown.

Most of Devon CDP lies within the boundary of Devon Elementary School, outside of the CDP. A small section is in the boundary of Hillside Elementary School in Tredyffrin Township.

The district operates two middle schools, Tredyffrin/Easttown and Valley Forge. Conestoga High School, located west of Devon, near Berwyn CDP, serves the CDP.

Devon Preparatory School, a Catholic school, is located just east of the CDP in Tredyffrin Township.

Parks
Hilltop Park, with a Devon address but outside the Devon CDP, is operated by the township government. It has a pavilion with toilets, a picnic area, two soccer fields, a "tot lot" and walking trails.

Notable people
Staci Keanan, attorney and actress
Dave Bush, baseball player and coach

Points of interest 
 Jenkins Arboretum, north of Devon
 Mount Zion A.M.E. Church
 Devon (SEPTA station)
 Devon Horse Show & Country Fair
 Valley Forge Music Fair (closed. 1996)

References

Philadelphia Main Line
Census-designated places in Chester County, Pennsylvania
Census-designated places in Pennsylvania